The Worry Trap: How to Free Yourself from Worry & Anxiety Using Acceptance & Commitment Therapy is a self-help book written by Chad LeJeune, Ph.D. in 2007.

Summary
Written for people dealing with chronic worry and anxiety, the book is based on the new principles in what is occasionally termed the Third Wave of Behavioral Therapy using acceptance and commitment therapy (ACT) 

The author, a professor of psychology and a founding fellow of the Academy of Cognitive Therapy, uses simple examples and analogies to illustrate how accepting and identifying your thoughts "As just mere thoughts" can help you step back and separate yourself emotionally from your actual thoughts and live more in the present moment, thus decreasing worry and anxiety. An increased awareness of the separate nature of your self stated as context and your actual experience stated as content in the book, can reduce worry and stress on a person which can lead to beneficial health aspects as well. 

While worrying is a natural emotion for everyone, excessive worrying can interfere with problem-solving and decision-making. The author uses a five-step model approach to guide the reader through learning the skills of acceptance and commitment therapy and applying them to the problem of worry. It starts off by discussing the "fight-or-flight" response and the normal impulse toward controlling thoughts and feelings. Finally, it guides you in taking actions directed by your values rather than by worry. 

The five steps are contained in the acronym LLAMP which is used throughout the book.--
Label “anxious thoughts”
Let go of control
Accept and observe thoughts and feelings
Mindfulness of the present moment
Proceed in the right direction

References

External links
   Academy of Cognitive Therapy

Self-help books
Anxiety
Popular psychology books